This is a list of the bird species recorded in Saint Lucia. The avifauna of Saint Lucia included a total of 195 species according to Bird Checklists of the World as of July 2022. Of them, five are endemic, three have been introduced by humans, and 120 are rare or accidental. There are also two subspecies endemic to the island. Six species are globally threatened.

This list is presented in the taxonomic sequence of the Check-list of North and Middle American Birds, 7th edition through the 63rd Supplement, published by the American Ornithological Society (AOS). Common and scientific names are also those of the Check-list, except that the common names of families are from the Clements taxonomy because the AOS list does not include them.

The following tags have been used to highlight several categories of occurrence.

(A) Accidental - a species that rarely or accidentally occurs in Saint Lucia
(E) Endemic - a species endemic to Saint Lucia
(ES) Endemic subspecies - a subspecies endemic to Saint Lucia
(I) Introduced - a species introduced directly to Saint Lucia or elsewhere in the New World

Ducks, geese, and waterfowl
Order: AnseriformesFamily: Anatidae

Anatidae includes the ducks and most duck-like waterfowl, such as geese and swans. These birds are adapted to an aquatic existence with webbed feet, flattened bills, and feathers that are excellent at shedding water due to an oily coating.

Black-bellied whistling-duck, Dendrocygna autumnalis (A)
West Indian whistling-duck, Dendrocygna arborea
Fulvous whistling-duck, Dendrocygna bicolor (A)
Blue-winged teal, Spatula discors
Northern shoveler, Spatula clypeata (A)
Gadwall, Mareca strepera (A)
American wigeon, Mareca americana (A)
Northern pintail, Anas acuta (A)
Green-winged teal, Anas crecca
Ring-necked duck, Aythya collaris (A)
Lesser scaup, Aythya affinis (A)
Masked duck, Nomonyx dominicus (A)
Ruddy duck, Oxyura jamaicensis (A)

Flamingos
Order: PhoenicopteriformesFamily: Phoenicopteridae

Flamingos filter-feed on shellfish and algae. Their oddly shaped beaks are specially adapted to separate mud and silt from the food they consume and, uniquely, are used upside-down.

American flamingo, Phoenicopterus ruber

Grebes
Order: PodicipediformesFamily: Podicipedidae

Grebes are small to medium-large freshwater diving birds. They have lobed toes and are excellent swimmers and divers. However, they have their feet placed far back on the body, making them quite ungainly on land.

Pied-billed grebe, Podilymbus podiceps (A)

Pigeons and doves
Order: ColumbiformesFamily: Columbidae

Pigeons and doves are stout-bodied birds with short necks and short slender bills with a fleshy cere.

Rock pigeon, Columba livia (I)
Scaly-naped pigeon, Patagioenas squamosa
White-crowned pigeon, Patagioenas leucocephala (A)
Eurasian collared-dove, Streptopelia decaocto (I)
Common ground dove, Columbina passerina
Ruddy quail-dove, Geotrygon montana
Bridled quail-dove, Geotrygon mystacea (A)
White-winged dove, Zenaida asiatica (A)
Zenaida dove, Zenaida aurita
Eared dove, Zenaida auriculata

Cuckoos
Order: CuculiformesFamily: Cuculidae

The family Cuculidae includes cuckoos, roadrunners, and anis. These birds are of variable size with slender bodies, long tails, and strong legs.

Smooth-billed ani, Crotophaga ani (A)
Yellow-billed cuckoo, Coccyzus americanus (A)
Mangrove cuckoo, Coccyzus minor
Black-billed cuckoo, Coccyzus erythropthalmus (A)

Nightjars and allies
Order: CaprimulgiformesFamily: Caprimulgidae

Nightjars are medium-sized nocturnal birds that usually nest on the ground. They have long wings, short legs, and very short bills. Most have small feet, of little use for walking, and long pointed wings. Their soft plumage is camouflaged to resemble bark or leaves.

Common nighthawk, Chordeiles minor (A)
Rufous nightjar, Antrostomus rufus

Swifts
Order: ApodiformesFamily: Apodidae

Swifts are small birds which spend the majority of their lives flying. These birds have very short legs and never settle voluntarily on the ground, perching instead only on vertical surfaces. Many swifts have long swept-back wings which resemble a crescent or boomerang.

Black swift, Cypseloides niger (A)
Lesser Antillean swift, Chaetura martinica
Short-tailed swift, Chaetura brachyura (A)
Alpine swift, Tachymarptis melba (A)

Hummingbirds
Order: ApodiformesFamily: Trochilidae

Hummingbirds are small birds capable of hovering in mid-air due to the rapid flapping of their wings. They are the only birds that can fly backwards.

Purple-throated carib, Eulampis jugularis
Green-throated carib, Eulampis holosericeus
Antillean crested hummingbird, Orthorhyncus cristatus

Rails, gallinules, and coots
Order: GruiformesFamily: Rallidae

Rallidae is a large family of small to medium-sized birds which includes the rails, crakes, coots, and gallinules. Typically they inhabit dense vegetation in damp environments near lakes, swamps, or rivers. In general they are shy and secretive birds, making them difficult to observe. Most species have strong legs and long toes which are well adapted to soft uneven surfaces. They tend to have short, rounded wings and to be weak fliers.

Sora, Porzana carolina (A)
Common gallinule, Gallinula galeata
American coot, Fulica americana (A)
Purple gallinule, Porphyrio martinica (A)

Stilts and avocets
Order: CharadriiformesFamily: Recurvirostridae

Recurvirostridae is a family of large wading birds which includes the avocets and stilts. The avocets have long legs and long up-curved bills. The stilts have extremely long legs and long, thin, straight bills.

Black-necked stilt, Himantopus mexicanus

Oystercatchers
Order: CharadriiformesFamily: Haematopodidae

The oystercatchers are large and noisy plover-like birds, with strong bills used for smashing or prising open molluscs.

American oystercatcher, Haematopus palliatus (A)

Plovers and lapwings
Order: CharadriiformesFamily: Charadriidae

The family Charadriidae includes the plovers, dotterels, and lapwings. They are small to medium-sized birds with compact bodies, short thick necks, and long, usually pointed, wings. They are found in open country worldwide, mostly in habitats near water.

Black-bellied plover, Pluvialis squatarola
American golden-plover, Pluvialis dominica (A)
Killdeer, Charadrius vociferus (A)
Semipalmated plover, Charadrius semipalmatus
Wilson's plover, Charadrius wilsonia
Collared plover, Charadrius collaris (A)

Sandpipers and allies
Order: CharadriiformesFamily: Scolopacidae

Scolopacidae is a large diverse family of small to medium-sized shorebirds including the sandpipers, curlews, godwits, shanks, tattlers, woodcocks, snipes, dowitchers, and phalaropes. The majority of these species eat small invertebrates picked out of the mud or soil. Variation in length of legs and bills enables multiple species to feed in the same habitat, particularly on the coast, without direct competition for food.

Whimbrel, Numenius phaeopus
Hudsonian godwit, Limosa haemastica (A)
Ruddy turnstone, Arenaria interpres
Red knot, Calidris canutus (A)
Ruff, Calidris pugnax (A)
Stilt sandpiper, Calidris himantopus (A)
Sanderling, Calidris alba (A)
Dunlin, Calidris alpina (A)
Baird's sandpiper, Calidris bairdii (A)
Least sandpiper, Calidris minutilla (A)
White-rumped sandpiper, Calidris fuscicollis (A)
Buff-breasted sandpiper, Calidris subruficollis (A)
Pectoral sandpiper, Calidris melanotos (A)
Semipalmated sandpiper, Calidris pusilla (A)
Western sandpiper, Calidris mauri (A)
Short-billed dowitcher, Limnodromus griseus (A)
Wilson's snipe, Gallinago delicata (A)
Spotted sandpiper, Actitis macularius
Solitary sandpiper, Tringa solitaria (A)
Lesser yellowlegs, Tringa flavipes
Willet, Tringa semipalmata (A)
Greater yellowlegs, Tringa melanoleuca

Skuas and jaegers
Order: CharadriiformesFamily: Stercorariidae

The family Stercorariidae are, in general, medium to large birds, typically with grey or brown plumage, often with white markings on the wings. They nest on the ground in temperate and arctic regions and are long-distance migrants.

South polar skua, Stercorarius maccormicki (A)
Pomarine jaeger, Stercorarius pomarinus (A)

Gulls, terns, and skimmers
Order: CharadriiformesFamily: Laridae

Laridae is a family of medium to large seabirds which includes gulls, kittiwakes, terns, and skimmers. They are typically grey or white, often with black markings on the head or wings. They have longish bills and webbed feet. Terns are a group of generally medium to large seabirds typically with grey or white plumage, often with black markings on the head. Most terns hunt fish by diving but some pick insects off the surface of fresh water. Terns are generally long-lived birds, with several species known to live in excess of 30 years.

Black-legged kittiwake, Rissa tridactyla (A)
Black-headed gull, Chroicocephalus ridibundus (A)
Laughing gull, Leucophaeus atricilla (A)
Ring-billed gull, Larus delawarensis (A)
Herring gull, Larus argentatus
Lesser black-backed gull, Larus fuscus (A)
Brown noddy, Anous stolidus
Sooty tern, Onychoprion fuscata
Bridled tern, Onychoprion anaethetus
Least tern, Sternula antillarum (A)
Gull-billed tern, Gelochelidon nilotica (A)
Caspian tern, Hydroprogne caspia (A)
Roseate tern, Sterna dougallii (A)
Common tern, Sterna hirundo (A)
Royal tern, Thalasseus maxima
Sandwich tern, Thalasseus sandvicensis (A)
Black skimmer, Rynchops niger (A)

Tropicbirds
Order: PhaethontiformesFamily: Phaethontidae

Tropicbirds are slender white birds of tropical oceans with exceptionally long central tail feathers. Their heads and long wings have black markings.

White-tailed tropicbird, Phaethon lepturus (A)
Red-billed tropicbird, Phaethon aethereus (A)

Southern storm-petrels
Order: ProcellariiformesFamily: Oceanitidae

The storm-petrels are the smallest seabirds, relatives of the petrels, feeding on planktonic crustaceans and small fish picked from the surface, typically while hovering. The flight is fluttering and sometimes bat-like. Until 2018, these species were included with the other storm-petrels in family Hydrobatidae.

Wilson's storm-petrel, Oceanites oceanicus (A)

Northern storm-petrels
Order: ProcellariiformesFamily: Hydrobatidae

The storm-petrels are the smallest seabirds, relatives of the petrels, feeding on planktonic crustaceans and small fish picked from the surface, typically while hovering. The flight is fluttering and sometimes bat-like.

Leach's storm-petrel, Hydrobates leucorhous (A)

Shearwaters and petrels
Order: ProcellariiformesFamily: Procellariidae

Though the members of this family are similar in many respects to the southern storm-petrels, including their general appearance and habits, there are enough genetic differences to warrant their placement in a separate family.

Cory's shearwater, Calonectris diomedea (A)
Great shearwater, Ardenna gravis (A)
Sooty shearwater, Ardenna griseus (A)
Audubon's shearwater, Puffinus lherminieri (A)

Frigatebirds
Order: SuliformesFamily: Fregatidae

Frigatebirds are large seabirds usually found over tropical oceans. They are large, black and white, or completely black, with long wings and deeply forked tails. The males have coloured inflatable throat pouches. They do not swim or walk and cannot take off from a flat surface. Having the largest wingspan-to-body-weight ratio of any bird, they are essentially aerial, able to stay aloft for more than a week.

Magnificent frigatebird, Fregata magnificens

Boobies and gannets
Order: SuliformesFamily: Sulidae

The sulids comprise the gannets and boobies. Both groups are medium to large coastal seabirds that plunge-dive for fish.

Masked booby, Sula dactylatra (A)
Brown booby, Sula leucogaster
Red-footed booby, Sula sula (A)

Anhingas
Order: SuliformesFamily: Anhingidae

Anhingas are often called "snake-birds" because of their long thin neck, which gives a snake-like appearance when they swim with their bodies submerged. The males have black and dark-brown plumage, an erectile crest on the nape, and a larger bill than the female. The females have much paler plumage especially on the neck and underparts. The darters have completely webbed feet and their legs are short and set far back on the body. Their plumage is somewhat permeable, like that of cormorants, and they spread their wings to dry after diving.

Anhinga, Anhinga anhinga (A)

Cormorants and shags
Order: SuliformesFamily: Phalacrocoracidae

Phalacrocoracidae is a family of medium to large coastal, fish-eating seabirds that includes cormorants and shags. Plumage colouration varies, with the majority having mainly dark plumage, some species being black-and-white, and a few being colourful.

Neotropic cormorant, Nannopterum brasilianum

Pelicans
Order: PelecaniformesFamily: Pelecanidae

Pelicans are large water birds with a distinctive pouch under their beak. As with other members of the order Pelecaniformes, they have webbed feet with four toes.

Brown pelican, Pelecanus occidentalis (A)

Herons, egrets, and bitterns
Order: PelecaniformesFamily: Ardeidae

The family Ardeidae contains the bitterns, herons, and egrets. Herons and egrets are medium to large wading birds with long necks and legs. Bitterns tend to be shorter necked and more wary. Members of Ardeidae fly with their necks retracted, unlike other long-necked birds such as storks, ibises, and spoonbills.

Great blue heron, Ardea herodias (A)
Gray heron, Ardea cinerea (A)
Great egret, Ardea alba
Little egret, Egretta garzetta (A)
Western reef-heron, Egretta gularis (A)
Snowy egret, Egretta thula (A)
Little blue heron, Egretta caerulea
Tricolored heron, Egretta tricolor (A)
Cattle egret, Bubulcus ibis
Green heron, Butorides virescens
Black-crowned night-heron, Nycticorax nycticorax (A)
Yellow-crowned night-heron, Nyctanassa violacea (A)

Ibises and spoonbills
Order: PelecaniformesFamily: Threskiornithidae

Threskiornithidae is a family of large terrestrial and wading birds which includes the ibises and spoonbills. They have long, broad wings with 11 primary and about 20 secondary feathers. They are strong fliers and despite their size and weight, very capable soarers.

Scarlet ibis, Eudocimus ruber (A)
Glossy ibis, Plegadis falcinellus (A)
Eurasian spoonbill, Platalea leucorodia (A)
Roseate spoonbill, Platalea ajaja (A)

Osprey
Order: AccipitriformesFamily: Pandionidae

The family Pandionidae contains only one species, the osprey. The osprey is a medium-large raptor which is a specialist fish-eater with a worldwide distribution.

Osprey, Pandion haliaetus (A)

Hawks, eagles, and kites
Order: AccipitriformesFamily: Accipitridae

Accipitridae is a family of birds of prey, which includes hawks, eagles, kites, harriers, and Old World vultures. These birds have powerful hooked beaks for tearing flesh from their prey, strong legs, powerful talons, and keen eyesight.

Northern harrier, Circus hudsonius (A)
Common black hawk, Buteogallus anthracinus (A)
Broad-winged hawk, Buteo platypterus
Red-tailed hawk, Buteo jamaicensis (A)

Barn-owls
Order: StrigiformesFamily: Tytonidae

Barn-owls are medium to large owls with large heads and characteristic heart-shaped faces. They have long strong legs with powerful talons.

Barn owl, Tyto alba

Kingfishers
Order: CoraciiformesFamily: Alcedinidae

Kingfishers are medium-sized birds with large heads, long pointed bills, short legs, and stubby tails.

Belted kingfisher, Megaceryle alcyon (A)

Bee-eaters
Order: CoraciiformesFamily: Meropidae

The bee-eaters are a group of near passerine birds in the family Meropidae. 

European bee-eater, Merops apiaster (A)

Falcons and caracaras
Order: FalconiformesFamily: Falconidae

Falconidae is a family of diurnal birds of prey. They differ from hawks, eagles, and kites in that they kill with their beaks instead of their talons.

American kestrel, Falco sparverius
Merlin, Falco columbarius (A)
Peregrine falcon, Falco peregrinus

New World and African parrots
Order: PsittaciformesFamily: Psittacidae

Parrots are small to large birds with a characteristic curved beak. Their upper mandibles have slight mobility in the joint with the skull and they have a generally erect stance. All parrots are zygodactyl, having the four toes on each foot placed two at the front and two to the back.

Saint Lucia parrot, Amazona versicolor (E)

Tyrant flycatchers
Order: PasseriformesFamily: Tyrannidae

Tyrant flycatchers are passerine birds which occur throughout North and South America. They superficially resemble the Old World flycatchers, but are more robust and have stronger bills. They do not have the sophisticated vocal capabilities of the songbirds. Most, but not all, have plain colouring. As the name implies, most are insectivorous.

Caribbean elaenia, Elaenia martinica
Yellow-bellied elaenia, Elaenia flavogaster (A)
Lesser Antillean flycatcher, Myiarchus oberi
Gray kingbird, Tyrannus dominicensis
Fork-tailed flycatcher, Tyrannus savana (A)
Lesser Antillean pewee, Contopus latirostris

Vireos, shrike-babblers, and erpornis
Order: PasseriformesFamily: Vireonidae

The vireos are a group of small to medium-sized passerine birds. They are typically greenish in colour and resemble New World warblers apart from their heavier bills.

Yellow-throated vireo, Vireo flavifrons (A)
Red-eyed vireo, Vireo olivaceus
Black-whiskered vireo, Vireo altiloquus

Swallows
Order: PasseriformesFamily: Hirundinidae

The family Hirundinidae is adapted to aerial feeding. They have a slender streamlined body, long pointed wings, and a short bill with a wide gape. The feet are adapted to perching rather than walking, and the front toes are partially joined at the base.

Bank swallow, Riparia riparia
Caribbean martin, Progne dominicensis
Barn swallow, Hirundo rustica
Cliff swallow, Petrochelidon pyrrhonota (A)
Cave swallow, Petrochelidon fulva (A)

Wrens
Order: PasseriformesFamily: Troglodytidae

The wrens are mainly small and inconspicuous except for their loud songs. These birds have short wings and thin down-turned bills. Several species often hold their tails upright. All are insectivorous.

House wren, Troglodytes aedon

Mockingbirds and thrashers
Order: PasseriformesFamily: Mimidae

The mimids are a family of passerine birds that includes thrashers, mockingbirds, tremblers, and the New World catbirds. These birds are notable for their vocalizations, especially their ability to mimic a wide variety of birds and other sounds heard outdoors. Their colouring tends towards dull-greys and browns.

White-breasted thrasher, Ramphocinclus brachyurus (A)
Scaly-breasted thrasher, Allenia fusca
Pearly-eyed thrasher, Margarops fuscatus
Brown trembler, Cinclocerthia ruficauda
Gray trembler, Cinclocerthia gutturalis macrorhyncha (ES)
Tropical mockingbird, Mimus gilvus

Thrushes and allies
Order: PasseriformesFamily: Turdidae

The thrushes are a group of passerine birds that occur mainly in the Old World. They are plump, soft plumaged, small to medium-sized insectivores or sometimes omnivores, often feeding on the ground. Many have attractive songs.

Rufous-throated solitaire, Myadestes genibarbis
Spectacled thrush, Turdus nudigenis
Forest thrush, Turdus lherminieri sanctaeluciae (ES)

Old World sparrows
Order: PasseriformesFamily: Passeridae

Sparrows are small passerine birds. In general, sparrows tend to be small, plump, brown or grey birds with short tails and short powerful beaks. Sparrows are seed eaters, but they also consume small insects.

House sparrow, Passer domesticus (I) (A)

Finches, euphonias, and allies
Order: PasseriformesFamily: Fringillidae

Finches are seed-eating passerine birds, that are small to moderately large and have a strong beak, usually conical and in some species very large. All have twelve tail feathers and nine primaries. These birds have a bouncing flight with alternating bouts of flapping and gliding on closed wings, and most sing well.

Antillean euphonia, Chlorophonia musica (A)

Troupials and allies
Order: PasseriformesFamily: Icteridae

The icterids are a group of small to medium-sized, often colourful, passerine birds restricted to the New World and include the grackles, New World blackbirds, and New World orioles. Most species have black as the predominant plumage colour, often enlivened by yellow, orange, or red.

Bobolink, Dolichonyx oryzivorus (A)
Saint Lucia oriole, Icterus laudabilis (E)
Baltimore oriole, Icterus galbula (A)
Shiny cowbird, Molothrus bonariensis
Carib grackle, Quiscalus lugubris

New World warblers
Order: PasseriformesFamily: Parulidae

The New World warblers are a group of small, often colourful, passerine birds restricted to the New World. Most are arboreal, but some are terrestrial. Most members of this family are insectivores.

Ovenbird, Seiurus aurocapilla (A)
Louisiana waterthrush, Parkesia motacilla (A)
Northern waterthrush, Parkesia noveboracensis (A)
Black-and-white warbler, Mniotilta varia (A)
Prothonotary warbler, Protonotaria citrea (A)
Semper's warbler, Leucopeza semperi (E) (possibly extinct)
Kentucky warbler, Geothlypis formosa (A)
Hooded warbler, Setophaga citrina
American redstart, Setophaga ruticilla (A)
Cape May warbler, Setophaga tigrina (A)
Northern parula, Setophaga americana (A)
Bay-breasted warbler, Setophaga castanea (A)
Yellow warbler, Setophaga petechia
Blackpoll warbler, Setophaga striata (A)
Black-throated blue warbler, Setophaga caerulescens (A)
Palm warbler, Setophaga palmarum (A)
Yellow-rumped warbler, Setophaga coronata (A)
Prairie warbler, Setophaga discolor
Saint Lucia warbler, Setophaga delicata (E)
Canada warbler, Cardellina canadensis (A)

Cardinals and allies
Order: PasseriformesFamily: Cardinalidae

The cardinals are a family of robust, seed-eating birds with strong bills. They are typically associated with open woodland. The sexes usually have distinct plumages.

Summer tanager, Piranga rubra (A)
Scarlet tanager, Piranga olivacea (A)
Rose-breasted grosbeak, Pheucticus ludovicianus (A)
Blue grosbeak, Passerina caerulea (A)

Tanagers and allies
Order: PasseriformesFamily: Thraupidae

The tanagers are a large group of small to medium-sized passerine birds restricted to the New World, mainly in the tropics. Many species are brightly coloured. As a family they are omnivorous, but individual species specialise in eating fruits, seeds, insects, or other types of food. Most have short, rounded wings.

Grassland yellow-finch, Sicalis luteola (A)
Bananaquit, Coereba flaveola
Lesser Antillean bullfinch, Loxigilla noctis
Black-faced grassquit, Melanospiza bicolor
Saint Lucia black finch, Melanospiza richardsoni (E)
Lesser Antillean saltator, Saltator albicollis

References

See also
List of birds
Lists of birds by region

Saint Lucia
 
Birds